Zeki Alasya (18 April 1943 – 8 May 2015) was a Turkish actor and film director. Alasya was of Turkish Cypriot descent and was related to Kıbrıslı Mehmed Kamil Pasha.

Biography
Alasya was born in Istanbul to a Turkish Cypriot family. After studying at Robert College, he joined MTTB Theatre as an amateur actor. For a short time, he worked at Arena, Gen-Ar and Ulvi Uraz Theatre. With some friends, he founded the Devekuşu Kabare Theatre (Ostrich Cabaret Theatre).

From 1973, he started acting in films and gained fame as a comedian paired with Metin Akpınar like Salak Milyoner, Beş Milyoncuk Borç Verir misin, Köyden İndim Şehire, Güler misin Ağlar mısın, Nerden Çıktı Bu Velet, Nereye Bakıyor Bu Adamlar, Hasip ile Nasip and Güle Güle. In 1977, he also took up directing and went on to direct films such as Aslan Bacanak, Sivri Akıllılar, Caferin Çilesi, Petrol Kralları, Doktor, Köşe Kapmaca, Vay Başımıza Gelenler and  Elveda Dostum.

Death
Alasya died on 8 May 2015 in the hospital, where he had been receiving treatment for liver disease. He was 72. He was laid to rest in Zincirlikuyu Cemetery following the religious funeral service held at Levent Mosque.

References

External links

Sinematürk
Biography of Zeki Alasya 

1943 births
2015 deaths
Male actors from Istanbul
Turkish people of Cypriot descent
Turkish comedians
Turkish male film actors
Turkish male stage actors
Turkish film directors
Golden Orange Life Achievement Award winners
Deaths from liver disease
Robert College alumni
Burials at Zincirlikuyu Cemetery